Adolf of Osnabrück, O.Cist (also known as Adolphus, Adolph, Adolf of Tecklenburg), was born in Tecklenburg about 1185, a member of the family of the Counts of Tecklenburg in the Duchy of Westphalia. During his lifetime, he became known as the "Almoner of the Poor", and is honored as a saint by the Catholic Church.

Life
Adolf became a canon of the Cathedral of Cologne, but then entered a Cistercian monastery, where he became known for his piety. In 1216 he was elected Bishop of Osnabrück (after an earlier election had been cancelled by the pope) and maintained charitable programs there. He died on 30 June 1222 or 1224.

Veneration
Adolf's cultus was recognized by Pope Urban VIII in 1625. His feast day is celebrated on 11 February.

References

1180s births
1220s deaths
German Cistercians
Cistercian bishops
Bishops of Osnabrück
13th-century Christian saints
German Roman Catholic saints
Cistercian saints